Mort Ransen (August 16, 1933 – September 4, 2021) was a Canadian film and television director, editor, screenwriter and producer, best known for his Genie Award-winning 1995 film Margaret's Museum.

Early life
Ransen was born Moishe Socoransky to Ukrainian immigrants, the youngest of four children in the Yiddish-speaking household of Shimmel and Fanny (née Bordoff) Socoransky. He attended Baron Byng High School, where a teacher suggested that he pursue a career in acting. He left school after grade nine and went to New York, where he studied under the highly-regarded acting teacher Peggy Feury. He  returned to Montreal, changed his name and began building an acting and directing career in theatre.

Career
In 1960, Ransen was hired by the National Film Board of Canada (NFB). Over the next 24 years, he would direct, write, edit and/or produce 21 films for the NFB. He was also teaching film studies classes at McGill University, where he gave his students cameras to create the celebrated 1968 film Christopher's Movie Matinee. He left the NFB in 1984 and directed film and TV projects for other producers. He would then create two additional films produced by the NFB: Ah... the Money, the Money, the Money: The Battle for Saltspring, and his most successful film, Margaret's Museum.

In 1997, Ransen moved to Salt Spring Island, British Columbia to live as a (self-described) 'hippie'. He did some theatre work and formed his own company, Ranfilm Productions, through which he created three more films, including the critically-acclaimed My Father's Angel.

Personal life and death
Ransen was married twice and had four children. He had been with his partner, theatre director Libby Mason, since 2000. 
After developing dementia, Ransen spent the last year of his life in a care home and died in Saltspring Island’s Lady Minto/Gulf Islands Hospital on September 4, 2021.

Filmography

The Teacher: Authority or Automaton? - documentary short, NFB 1961 - director 
Jacky Visits the Zoo - short film, NFB 1962 - writer, director
The Fatal Mistakes - training film, NFB 1963 - director
Fighting Fit - training film, NFB 1964 - director  
Zero Point One - training film, NFB 1964 - director  
The Inner Man - documentary short, NFB 1964 - co-producer, co-director
Among Fish - documentary, short NFB 1964 - co-director
The Transition - documentary short, NFB 1964 - writer, director
John Hirsch: A Portrait of a Man and a Theatre - documentary short, NFB 1965 - director 
Labour College - documentary short, NFB 1966 - director  
No Reason to Stay - short film, NFB 1966 - co-writer, co-editor, director
The Circle - documentary, NFB 1967 - writer, director 
Christopher's Movie Matinee - documentary, NFB 1968 - editor, director 
Falling from Ladders - documentary short, NFB 1969 - editor, director
Overspill - documentary short, NFB 1970 - director
The Burden They Carry - documentary short, NFB 1970 - director  
Untouched and Pure - documentary, NFB 1970 - co-director  
Running Time - feature, NFB 1974 - writer, co-editor, director
The Russels - short film, NFB 1978 - co-writer, co-director 
Bayo - feature, NFB 1985 - co-writer, director 
Mortimer Griffin and Shalinsky - short film, NFB 1985 - co-writer, director 
Street Legal - A Matter of Honour - series episode, CBC 1987 - director 
Shades of Love: Sincerely, Violet - video, Blackthorn Productions 1987 - co-director 
Shades of Love: The Emerald Tear - TV Movie, Blackthorn Productions 1988 - director
Shades of Love: Tangerine Taxi - TV Movie, Blackthorn Productions, 1988 - director 
Falling Over Backwards - feature, Moving Image Productions 1990 - writer, co-producer, director 
Margaret's Museum - feature, NFB 1995 - co-writer, co-producer, director
Touched - feature, Ranfilm Productions 1999 - co-writer, co-editor, producer, director
My Father's Angel - feature, Ranfilm Productions 1999 - producer
Ah... the Money, the Money, the Money: The Battle for Saltspring - documentary, NFB 2001 - writer, director
Bastards - feature, Ranfilm Productions 2003 - writer, editor, producer, director

Awards

Jacky Visits the Zoo (1962)
 International Festival of Films for Television, Rome: Second Prize, Silver Plaque, Children's Films, 1963

No Reason to Stay (1966) 
 American Film and Video Festival, New York: Blue Ribbon, Personal Guidance, 1967
 Columbus International Film & Animation Festival, Columbus, Ohio: Chris Award, Education & Information, 1967
 La Plata International Children's Film Festival, La Plata, Argentina: Best Film of the Festival - Gold Plaque, 1968
 Annual Landers Associates Awards, New York: Award of Merit, 1966
 Melbourne International Film Festival, Melbourne: Diploma of Merit, 1967
 International Exhibition of Scientific Film, Buenos Aires: Diploma of Honour, 1968

Christopher's Movie Matinee (1968) 
 Adelaide Film Festival, Adelaide Australia: Certificate of Merit 1970

Falling from Ladders (1969)
 International Festival of Short Films, Philadelphia: Award for Exceptional Merit, 1971

Untouched and Pure (1970)
 Chicago International Film Festival, Chicago: Silver Hugo, Education, 1965

Mortimer Griffin and Shalinsky (1985) 
 American Film and Video Festival, New York: Red Ribbon, Literary Adaptations, 1988

Margaret's Museum (1995) 
 San Sebastián International Film Festival, San Sebastián, Spain: Best Film, 1995
 Vancouver International Film Festival, Vancouver: Most Popular Canadian Film, 1995
 16th Genie Awards, Toronto: Best Screenplay, 1996

My Father's Angel (1999)
 Leo Awards, Vancouver: Best Feature Length Drama, 2000

References

External links

Watch films directed by Ransen at NFB.ca

1933 births
2021 deaths
Anglophone Quebec people
Best Screenplay Genie and Canadian Screen Award winners
Canadian documentary film directors
Canadian male screenwriters
Canadian television directors
Film directors from Montreal
High School of Montreal alumni
National Film Board of Canada people
Writers from Montreal
People with dementia
Deaths by euthanasia
Film producers from Quebec